The following events occurred in radio in 2010.

Events
January - Radio Mashaal is launched; the new station is a member of Radio Free Europe in Pakistan, broadcasting in the Pashto language. It was launched in January 2010.
March - Indian radio station Radio City launches its first internet station, Radio City Fun Ka Antenna.

Debuts
Andar ng mga Balita, weekday news bulletin on Radyo5 92.3 News FM in Mega Manila, Philippines, anchored by Martin Andanar. Ran until 2012.
Breakfast with Hector, breakfast radio programme on RTÉ 2fm in Ireland, presented by Hector Ó hEochagáin. Ran until 2013.
Day 6, Canadian Saturday morning show on CBC Radio One, hosted by Brent Bambury.
S.R.O., radio talk show on DZMM in the Philippines
103.5 Wow FM (now 103.5 K Lite) begins broadcast in Pasig, Philippines.

Closings
Key Net Radio, Japanese Internet radio programme (begun 2007)
Lørdagsbarnetimen (Saturday Children's Hour), the world's longest-running regular weekly radio series, having begun in 1924.
MMDA Radio was cease operations due to broken transmitting tower.

Deaths
31 January - Thorleif Karlsen, Norwegian police inspector, politician and radio host, 100
19 February - Bull Verweij, Dutch businessman, co-founder of Radio Veronica, 100  
30 April - Cristina Corrales, Bolivian journalist, radio broadcaster, and politician, 47
14 June - Richard Herrmann, Norwegian journalist, writer and radio personality (NRK), 90 
8 July - Lelio Luttazzi, Italian composer, actor, television and radio presenter, 87
21 August - Hugo Guerrero Marthineitz, Peruvian journalist, commentator and radio host, 86
20 September - Fud Leclerc, musician and singer, four-time Eurovision contestant, 86
5 October - Yakov Alpert, Ukrainian-born physicist, expert on radio communications, 99

References

 
Radio by year